The Germanic substrate hypothesis attempts to explain the purportedly distinctive nature of the Germanic languages within the context of the Indo-European languages. Based on the elements of Common Germanic vocabulary and syntax which do not seem to have cognates in other Indo-European languages, it claims that Proto-Germanic may have been either a creole or a contact language that subsumed a non-Indo-European substrate language, or a hybrid of two quite different Indo-European languages, mixing the centum and satem types. Which culture or cultures may have contributed the substrate material is an ongoing subject of academic debate and study.

Supporters 
The non-Indo-European substrate hypothesis attempts to explain the anomalous features of Proto-Germanic as a result of creolization between an Indo-European and a non-Indo-European language.  The non-Indo-European substrate theory was first proposed by Sigmund Feist in 1910, who estimated that roughly a third of Proto-Germanic lexical items came from a non-Indo-European substrate and that the supposed reduction of the Proto-Germanic inflectional system was the result of pidginization with that substrate. 

Germanicist John A. Hawkins sets forth some modern arguments for a Germanic substrate. Hawkins argues that the Proto-Germans encountered a non-Indo-European speaking people and borrowed many features from their language. He hypothesizes that the first sound shift of Grimm's law was the result of non-native speakers attempting to pronounce Indo-European sounds and that they resorted to the closest sounds in their own language in their attempt to pronounce them. 

Kalevi Wiik, a phonologist, put forward a hypothesis that the pre-Germanic substrate was of a non-Indo-European Finnic origin. Wiik claimed that there are similarities between mistakes in English pronunciation typical of Finnish-speakers and the historical sound changes from Proto-Indo-European to Proto-Germanic. Wiik's argument is based on the assumption that only three language groups existed in pre-Indo-European Europe: Uralic, Indo-European and Basque, corresponding to three ice age refugia. Then, Uralic speakers would have been the first to settle most of Europe, and the language of the Indo-European invaders was influenced by the native Uralic population, producing Proto-Germanic. Existing evidence of languages outside the three refugia that he proposes (such as the proposed Tyrsenian language family or the undeciphered Vinča symbols) potentially creates a complication for Wiik's hypothesis that Uralic languages dominated the Proto-Germanic urheimat. Moreover, his thinking relies on an interpretation of Indo-European origins that is different from the mainstream. On the other hand, the Germanic language family is believed to have dominated in southern Scandinavia for a time before spreading south. This would place it geographically close to the Finnic group during its earliest stages of differentiation from other Indo-European languages, which is consistent with Wiik's theory.

Theo Vennemann hypothesized in 2003 the subsumption of a "Vasconic" substrate ancestral to Basque by a Semitic superstrate to form Proto-Germanic. However, his speculations were dismissed by linguists Philip Baldi and B. Richard Page in a review in Lingua.

Possible substrate cultures 
Archaeology has identified candidates for possible substrate culture(s), including the Maglemosian, Nordwestblock and Funnelbeaker culture but also older cultures of northern Europe like the  Hamburgian or even the Lincombian-Ranisian-Jerzmanowician culture.

The battle-axe people have also been proposed as candidates for the people who influenced Germanic with their non-Indo-European speech. Alternatively, in the framework of the Kurgan hypothesis, the battle-axe people may be seen as an already "kurganized" culture, built on the substrate of the earlier Funnelbeaker culture.

The Battle Axe culture was spread through a wider range of regions across Eastern and Central Europe, already close to or in contact with areas inhabited by Indo-European speakers and their putative area of origin, and none of the Indo-European proto-languages thus produced or their succeeding languages developed along the much larger line of extension of the battle-axe people (Celto-Italic, Illyrian, Slavic, Baltic and others) appear to have been affected by the same changes that are limited to the Proto-Germanic.

Objections

Controversial non-etymologies

Many of Hawkins's purported non-etymologies are controversial. One obvious way to refute the Germanic substrate hypothesis is to find Indo-European etymologies for the words on Hawkins's list. The process continues, but several cited as examples by Hawkins can likely be eliminated. For example, it is generally agreed that helmet represents IE  'to hide, conceal' (cf. Sanskrit  'shelter, cover', Thracian  'hide'). East relates to IE  'dawn'.

Some of the words may have Indo-European derivations that are simply not well preserved in other Indo-European languages. For example, it has been suggested that wife is related to Tocharian B  'shame, vulva', from a reconstructed root . Other possible etymologies include:

ebb: from  'off, away'
south: from *sunþera- which is in turn from *sunnōn 'the sun', from the oblique stem of *sóh₂wl̥
west: from *westera- which is in turn from *wes-, reduced form of *wespero 'evening'
shield: from *skel- 'to cut'
stork: from *str̥go- which is the zero-grade form of *ster- 'stiff'
bear: 'the brown one' (a taboo avoidance term, or tabooistic formation) from *bʰerH- 'bright, brown'; or directly from *ǵʰwer- 'wild animal'
drink: from *dʰrénǵe-, presentive of *dʰreǵ- 'to draw, pull'
groom (as in bridegroom): from *(dʰ)gʰm̥on which is the zero-grade suffixed form of *dʰgʰom- 'earth'. The word bridegroom derives from Middle English  and Old English , a compound of brȳd 'bride' and guma 'man'. The intrusive r in Modern English bridegroom is due to contamination with the word groom (of different meaning), the origin of which is unknown.
ship: from *skei-, a root originally meaning 'to cut' (cf. En shift, ON  'to regulate, control'), or compare Greek  (σκάπτω) 'I dig', referring to a dugout boat.
strand: from *ster-, meaning 'wide, flat'.
king, Old English cyning: The cyn- part is cognate with Modern English 'kin' and related to Latin , etc., from *ǵenh1- 'beget, engender'. Even the derivation has IE parallels, such as Hittite  'king' from ḫāš-, ḫašš- 'engender'.

Calvert Watkins's 1969 appendix of Indo-European roots in the American Heritage Dictionary listed several roots that were believed to be unique to Germanic at the time. More recent editions have substantially reduced the number of roots claimed to be uniquely Germanic.

Grimm's law
Against the theories regarding substrata, a profound sound change in the Germanic languages, Grimm's law, has been put forward as evidence for the Germanic languages being non-substratic and having changed, by their own accord, away from other branches of Indo-European. Grimm's law affected all of the stops that were inherited from Proto-Indo-European. The Germanic languages also share common innovations in grammar as well as in phonology: the Germanic verb has been extensively remodelled and shows fewer grammatical moods and markedly fewer inflections for the passive voice.

Current scholarship 
In the 21st century, treatments of Proto-Germanic tend to reject or simply omit discussion of the Germanic substrate hypothesis. For instance, Joseph B. Voyles' Early Germanic Grammar makes no mention of the hypothesis. On the other hand, the substrate hypothesis remains popular with the Leiden school of historical linguistics. This group influenced the 4-volume Dutch dictionary (2003-2009) — the first etymological dictionary of any language that systematically took the hypothesis into its discussions.

Guus Kroonen brought up the so-called "Agricultural Substrate Hypothesis", based on the comparison of presumable Pre-Germanic and Pre-Greek substrate lexicon (especially agricultural terms without clear IE etymologies). Kroonen links that substrate to the gradual spread of agriculture in Neolithic Europe from Anatolia and the Balkans, and associates the Pre-Germanic agricultural substrate language with the Linear Pottery culture. The prefix *a- and the suffix *-it- are the most apparent linguistic markers by which a small group of "Agricultural" substrate words - i.e. *arwīt ("pea") or *gait ("goat") - can be isolated from the rest of the Proto-Germanic lexicon. According to Aljoša Šorgo, there are at least 36 Proto-Germanic lexical items very likely originating from the "agricultural" substrate language (or a group of closely related languages). It is proposed by Šorgo that the Agricultural substrate was characterized by a four-vowel system of */æ/ */ɑ/ */i/ */u/, the presence of pre-nasalized stops, the absence of a semi-vowel */j/, a mobile stress accent, and reduction of unstressed vowels.

See also 
 Ancient Belgian language
 Haplogroup I-M170
 Pitted Ware culture
 Scandinavian Hunter-Gatherer
 Funnelbeaker culture
 Germanic parent language
 Goidelic substrate hypothesis
 Language shift
 Neolithic Europe
 Nordwestblock
 Old European hydronymy
 Pre-Indo-European languages
 Theo Vennemann, Atlantic (Semitic) languages

References

Sources 
 Robert S. P. Beekes (1995), Comparative Indo-European Linguistics: An Introduction. Amsterdam: John Benjamins. 
 John A. Hawkins (1990), "Germanic Languages", The Major Languages of Western Europe, ed. Bernard Comrie. London: Routledge, pp. 58-66. 
 Guus Kroonen (2013). Etymological Dictionary of Proto-Germanic. Leiden: Brill.
 Yury Kuzmenko (2011). Early Germanic tribes and their neighbours. Linguistics, archaeology and genetics. (in Russian). Saint Petersburg. 
 Edgar C. Polomé (1990), "Types of Linguistic Evidence for Early Contact: Indo-Europeans and Non-Indo-Europeans", When Worlds Collide: The Indo-Europeans and the Pre-Indo-Europeans, eds. T.L. Markey & J.A.C. Greppin. Ann Arbor (Mich): Karoma. pp. 267-89.
 Eduard Prokosch (1939), A Comparative Germanic Grammar. Philadelphia: University of Pennsylvania, Linguistic Society of America. 
 Orrin W. Robinson (1992), Old English and its Closest Relatives: A Survey of the Earliest Germanic Languages. Stanford: Stanford University Press. 
 Theo Vennemann (2003), "Languages in prehistoric Europe north of the Alps", Languages in Prehistoric Europe, eds. Alfred Bammesberger & Theo Vennemann. Heidelberg: C. Winter, pp. 319-332.
 Joseph B. Voyles (1992), Early Germanic Grammar. San Diego, Cal.: Academic Press. 
 Calvert Watkins. ed. (1985), The American Heritage Dictionary of Indo-European Roots. Boston: Houghton Mifflin. 
 Calvert Watkins, ed. (2000), The American Heritage Dictionary of Indo-European Roots, 2nd edn. Boston: Houghton Mifflin. 
 Kalevi Wiik (2002), Eurooppalaisten juuret (in Finnish; "Roots of Europeans").
 Kalevi Wiik (2004), Suomalaisten juuret (in Finnish; "Roots of Finns").

Germanic philology
Pre-Indo-Europeans
Indo-European linguistics
Linguistic strata
1932 in science